Harleston Magpies is a field hockey club based near the town of Harleston. It was established in 1935. The club's home ground is at Shotford Heath, just south of the Norfolk market town of Harleston. The club boasts two AstroTurf pitches – one water-based and the other sand-based, with a clubhouse and large car park for members and visitors. The ladies 1st team play in the Women's England Hockey League. The ladies 2nd team play in East Region Hockey Association League. Other ladies sides play in the Empressa Norfolk Women's Hockey League. Men's teams also play in the East Region Hockey Association League. The club also fields development, youth, veterans, mixed and indoor teams.

Formative years
Founded in 1935, Harleston Magpies is one of the oldest clubs in the East Region. It was named after the Harleston Magpie public house in the town of Harleston, now the JD Young Hotel.

Information about the club
Harleston Magpies was formed in 1935 and named after the well-known public house which hosted the inaugural meeting. A separate ladies club was formed in 1954 with a successful merger following in 1974. Two years later the present clubhouse was built – and later extended – and in 1982 the club bought the freehold of most of its grounds.

Over the years the club has continued to improve its facilities and in 1990 put down a sand-based artificial grass pitch, which was re-carpeted in 2006, and in 2002 put down a water-based artificial grass pitch. In the summer of 2007 the club's floodlights were upgraded, the clubhouse balcony replaced and a disabled toilet and stairlift installed. These developments would not have been possible without the invaluable help of Mid Suffolk DC, South Norfolk DC, Sport England, the Foundation for Sport and the Arts and many club members, sponsors and supporters.

The club, which is renowned for its friendly family atmosphere, has developed a large and active youth section drawn from the local community due in no small part to the decision in 1995 to appoint a Youth Development Officer to promote hockey at the club and in the community.

The club aims to instill a lifelong interest in the game in its members, has been one of the most consistently successful in East Anglia over the last twenty years (despite the inevitable ups and downs) and seeks to serve the local community, placing great emphasis on its youth development programme, by providing hockey for men, women, boys and girls – of all ages and abilities.

In 2007 the club was awarded Clubs 1st status by England Hockey. Clubs 1st is part of Sport England Clubmark – a nationally recognised accreditation for sports clubs.

The club aims to ensure that as many people as possible within the community who might wish to join the club are made aware of its activities through, mainly, the local press and radio, the club's excellent website, the Harleston Grapevine magazine and the notice board near the Harleston Post Office.

Notable events in the past 40 years of the club have included –

 Built (and later extended) its clubhouse in 1976
 Bought its own ground in 1982
 Put down a sand-based artificial grass pitch in 1990
 Put down a water-based pitch in 2002
 Re-carpeted the sand-based pitch in 2006

Location

The clubhouse and pitches are based at Shotford Heath, between Harleston and Weybread. Although Magpies are registered as Norfolk hockey club, they actually play in Suffolk, the River Waveney marking the boundary between the counties. Directions to the clubhouse are here.

Teams

The table below shows teams entered into leagues in the 2014/2015 season, with their league title and final position.

Men's 1st XI 2014/2015
Captain – Mark Wheelhouse 
Vice Captain – Leigh Sitch
Coach – Ben Wright
Manager – Steve Leate

Men's 2nd XI 2014/2015
Captain – Dickon Taylor
Vice Captain – Robbie Kinsella

Ladies 1st XI 2014/2015
Captain – Lucy Belsey
Vice Captain – Debbie Francis
Manager – Nick McAllen
Coach – Clyde Camburn
Assistant Coach – Susan Wessells

Ladies' 1st XI squad for 2014/2014 season

Based on data from England Hockey team specs. Positions and numbers to be confirmed.

Ladies 2nd XI 2014/2015
Captain – Samantha Tea

References

English field hockey clubs
Field hockey clubs established in 1935
1935 establishments in England
Sport in Norfolk